David Richard Henderson (born November 21, 1950) is a Canadian-born American economist and author who moved to the United States in 1972 and became a U.S. citizen in 1986, serving on President Ronald Reagan's Council of Economic Advisers from 1982 to 1984.  A research fellow at Stanford University's Hoover Institution  since 1990, he took a teaching position with the Naval Postgraduate School in Monterey, California in 1984, and is now an emeritus professor of economics.

Education 

Henderson earned his B.Sc (1970) from the University of Winnipeg, followed by his M.A. and Ph.D.(1976) in Economics from UCLA.  Henderson's areas of scholarly interest include microeconomics, cost–benefit analysis, health economics, energy economics, and the economics of taxation.

Career 

A friend of economist Milton Friedman since they first met at the University of Chicago in 1970, Henderson took his advice to, "make politics an avocation, not a vocation," pursuing a career course that led to earning a Ph.D. in economics. Henderson first taught at the University of Rochester, Graduate School of Management, from 1975 to 1979. Next, he took a position at San Francisco-based Cato Institute from 1979-1980, and then a short stint at Santa Clara University from 1980 to 1981.  In 1982, Henderson joined President Reagan's administration as a senior economist with the Council of Economic Advisers, serving as senior economist for health policy from 1982 to 1984 and then senior economist for energy policy from 1983 to 1984.  Henderson writes about socioeconomic issues at the blog EconLog, along with Bryan Caplan, which The Wall Street Journal designated as one of the top 25 economics blogs in 2009.

Henderson has written articles appearing in publications such as The New York Times, The Wall Street Journal, Forbes, Los Angeles Times, Chicago Tribune, Barron's, Fortune, The Freeman, The Public Interest, and The Christian Science Monitor. Henderson was the economics editor for the National Review the "Wartime Economist" for Antiwar.com and a contributing editor for Reason magazine He is a Senior Fellow with the Vancouver-based Fraser Institute. He has appeared on C-SPAN, The O'Reilly Factor, CNN, MSNBC, RT, the Jim Lehrer Newshour and the John Stossel TV show, along with numerous  radio shows and interviews with the BBC, KQED-FM, NPR and local radio affiliates. 
Henderson has travelled to Washington D.C. to testify before the House Ways and Means Committee, the Senate Armed Services Committee, and the Senate Committee on Labor and Human Resources. A number of his research articles have appeared in scholarly journals, including Journal of Monetary Economics, The Independent Review, Cato Journal, Regulation, Journal of Policy Analysis and Management, The Energy Journal , and Contemporary Economic Policy.

Awards 
 Rear Admiral John Jay Schieffelin Award for Excellence in Instruction at the Naval Postgraduate School, 1997
 Louis D. Liskin Award for Excellence in Teaching, June 2003, June 2004, and June 2007, Graduate School of Business and Public Policy

Books and publications 
 The Fortune Encyclopedia of Economics; New York: Warner Books, editor, 1994
 The Joy of Freedom: An Economist's Odyssey; Upper Saddle River, NJ: Financial Times (Prentice Hall), 2001
 Making Great Decisions in Business and Life, with Charles L. Hooper; Chicago Park: CA, Chicago Park Press; 1st edition, 2007
 The Concise Encyclopedia of Economics, editor. Indianapolis, IN: Liberty Fund, Inc., 2008 
 "The Supply-Side Tax Revenue Effects of the Child Care Tax Credit," Journal of Policy Analysis and Management, Vol. 8, No. 4 (Autumn, 1989), pp. 673–675
 "A Humane Economist's Case for Drug Legalization," UC Davis Law Review, University of California, Davis, Vol. 24, 1991, pp. 655–676
 "Lessons of East Asia's economic growth," Obits, Foreign Policy Research Institute, Volume 41, Issue 3, Summer, July 1, 1997, pp. 427–443
 "Do We Need to Go to War for Oil?" ''Independent Policy Reports', Independent Institute, September 1, 2007

References

External links 

 Homepage
 
 

1950 births
Living people
20th-century American economists
20th-century American male writers
20th-century American non-fiction writers
21st-century American economists
21st-century American male writers
21st-century American non-fiction writers
American economics writers
American libertarians
American male non-fiction writers
American political writers
Canadian emigrants to the United States
Hoover Institution people
Libertarian economists
Naval Postgraduate School faculty
Non-interventionism
University of California, Los Angeles alumni
University of Winnipeg alumni